Jan van de Graaff (born 24 September 1944) is a retired Dutch rower. He won the world title in the coxed pair at the 1966 World Rowing Championships and a bronze medal in the coxed fours at the 1964 Summer Olympics. At the 1964 Olympics his team mates were Marius Klumperbeek (cox), Lex Mullink, Bobbie van de Graaf and Freek van de Graaff. The three "van de Graaf(f)s" were all born in 1944.

References

External links

1944 births
Living people
Dutch male rowers
Olympic rowers of the Netherlands
Rowers at the 1964 Summer Olympics
Olympic bronze medalists for the Netherlands
Sportspeople from Hengelo
Olympic medalists in rowing
World Rowing Championships medalists for the Netherlands
Medalists at the 1964 Summer Olympics